Stuart Fratkin (born September 22, 1963) is an American actor, best known for playing Fitz in the movie Ski School. Fratkin also starred in They Came from Outer Space with Ski School co-star Dean Cameron.

Fratkin has been in several movies, including Godzilla, Prehysteria! and Teen Wolf Too.

Fratkin has guest starred on many television series over a 20-year career, including Melrose Place, Friends, The Golden Girls, Baywatch, Baywatch Nights, Touched by an Angel and NYPD Blue.

External links

1963 births
Male actors from Los Angeles
American male film actors
American male television actors
Living people